Ferdinand Andri (1 March 1871 – 19 May 1956) was an Austrian architect. His work was part of the architecture event in the art competition at the 1936 Summer Olympics.

References

1871 births
1956 deaths
20th-century Austrian architects
Olympic competitors in art competitions
People from Waidhofen an der Ybbs